This is the list of recognized regional languages in the Philippines as ordered and permitted by the Department of Education (Philippines) under the Mother Tongue-Based Multi-Lingual Education (MTB-MLE) strategy:

 Aklanon
 Bikol
 Cebuano
 Chavacano
 Hiligaynon
 Ibanag
 Ilocano
 Ivatan
 Kapampangan
 Kinaray-a
 Maguindanao
 Maranao
 Pangasinan
 Sambal
 Surigaonon
 Tagalog
 Tausug
 Waray
 Yakan

Objective
The Philippines' Department of Education decided to implement the program starting school year 2012. The Mother Tongue is primarily taught at kindergarten and grades 1, 2 and 3. The adoption of regional languages as medium of teaching is based on studies which tend to show that using the mother tongue as the language of instruction in the classroom literacy among Filipinos bolster comprehension and critical thinking skills of Filipino children in the school and facilitate learning of second language such as English and the Philippines' national language called Filipino. Filipino is Tagalog-based which means that speakers of Tagalog are speakers of the Philippine national language.

Other languages
There are approximately more than 175 languages and dialects in the Philippines which form part of the regional languages group. A few of these languages and dialects are spoken by in islands communities such as Abaknon in Capul island.

References